Laudato si' is medieval Central Italian for 'Praise be to you'.

 "Laudato si, a frequent phrase in the Canticle of the Sun by Francis of Assisi
 Laudato si', the second encyclical of Pope Francis
 Laudato si', an oratorio by Helmut Schlegel and Peter Reulein